Jacob Scarfone (born April 10, 1994) is a Canadian football wide receiver for the BC Lions of the Canadian Football League (CFL).

University career 
Scarfone played U Sports football for the Guelph Gryphons from 2013 to 2017, although he missed the 2016 season due to injury. In four seasons with the Gryphons, he recorded 109 receptions for 1,789 yards and 17 touchdowns. He was named a U Sports Second Team All-Canadian in 2017.

Professional career

Hamilton Tiger-Cats 
Scarfone had missed his entire fourth year of U Sports eligibility in 2016, but was still drafted in the sixth round, 47th overall, by the Hamilton Tiger-Cats in the 2017 CFL Draft and signed with the team on May 24, 2017. He began the season on the team's practice roster and was released on July 31, 2017 in order to complete his university playing career. On December 7, 2017, it was announced that he had re-signed with the Tiger-Cats to a two-year contract. However, he was released with the final 2018 training camp cuts on June 10, 2018.

Ottawa Redblacks 
On July 3, 2018, Scarfone signed a practice roster agreement with the Ottawa Redblacks, but he was released shortly after on July 8, 2018. He was then re-signed on September 18, 2018, and played in his first career regular season game on October 5, 2018, against the Winnipeg Blue Bombers. He played in four regular season games that year and also played in his first Grey Cup game, but the Redblacks lost the 106th Grey Cup championship to the Calgary Stampeders.

Scarfone began the 2019 season on the injured list and played in a week 4 game against the Blue Bombers before moving to the practice roster. He returned to the active roster later in the season and recorded his first career reception on August 24, 2021, against the Saskatchewan Roughriders. He finished the year with seven games played and had three catches for 17 yards. He became a free agent on February 11, 2020, following the expiration of his contract, but did not sign with any team as the 2020 CFL season was ultimately cancelled.

BC Lions 
On January 27, 2021, it was announced that Scarfone had signed with the BC Lions, re-uniting him with former Redblacks coach, Rick Campbell. He scored his first career touchdown on a 32-yard reception from Michael Reilly on October 30, 2021, against the Toronto Argonauts in overtime.

References

External links
 BC Lions bio

1994 births
Living people
Canadian football wide receivers
Guelph Gryphons football players
Hamilton Tiger-Cats players
Ottawa Redblacks players
Players of Canadian football from Ontario
Sportspeople from London, Ontario
BC Lions players